Rio Negro (Portuguese for "black river") is a river on the border between Paraná and Santa Catarina states in southeastern Brazil. It is part of the Paraná River basin, and a tributary of the Iguazu River.

See also
List of rivers of Santa Catarina
List of rivers of Paraná

References
 Map from Ministry of Transport

Rivers of Santa Catarina (state)
Rivers of Paraná (state)